Shag Musa Medani (born 17 October 1948) is a Sudanese long-distance runner. He competed in the marathon at the 1972 Summer Olympics.

References

External links
 

1948 births
Living people
Athletes (track and field) at the 1972 Summer Olympics
Sudanese male long-distance runners
Sudanese male marathon runners
Olympic athletes of Sudan
Place of birth missing (living people)